The Roman Catholic Archdiocese of Uberaba is an archdiocese located in the city of Uberaba in Brazil.

History
 29 September 1907: Established as Diocese of Uberaba from the Diocese of Goiás
 14 April 1962: Promoted as Metropolitan Archdiocese of Uberaba

Bishops

Ordinaries, in reverse chronological order
 Archbishops of Uberaba (Roman rite), below
 Archbishop Paulo Mendes Peixoto, (2014.03.07)
 Archbishop Aloísio Roque Oppermann, S.C.J. (1996.02.28 – 2012.03.07)
 Archbishop Benedito de Ulhôa Vieira (1978.07.14 – 1996.02.28)
 Archbishop Alexandre Gonçalves do Amaral (1962.04.14 – 1978.07.14)
 Bishops of Uberaba (Roman Rite), below
 Bishop Alexandre Gonçalves do Amaral (later Archbishop) (1939.08.05 – 1962.04.14)
 Bishop Antonio Colturato, O.F.M. Cap. (1929.08.02 – 1938.04.12), appointed Bishop of Botucatu
 Bishop Antônio de Almeida Lustosa, S.D.B. (1924.07.04 – 1928.12.17), appointed Bishop of Corumbá, Mato Grosso do Sul; future Archbishop
 Bishop José Tupinambá da Frota (1923.04.06 – 1924.03.10), appointed Bishop of Sobral, Ceara 
 Bishop Eduardo Duarte e Silva (1907.11.06 – 1923.05.14), appointed titular Archbishop upon resignation

Coadjutor archbishop
José Pedro de Araújo Costa (1968-1978), did not succeed to see

Other priests of this diocese who became bishops
Almir Marques Ferreira, appointed Auxiliary Bishop of Sorocaba in 1957
Antônio Braz Benevente, appointed Bishop of Jacarezinho, Parana in 2010

Suffragan dioceses
 Diocese of Ituiutaba 
 Diocese of Patos de Minas
 Diocese of Uberlândia

References

Sources
 GCatholic.org
 Catholic Hierarchy
 website (Portuguese)

Roman Catholic dioceses in Brazil
Roman Catholic ecclesiastical provinces in Brazil
 
Christian organizations established in 1907
Roman Catholic dioceses and prelatures established in the 20th century
1907 establishments in Brazil